Gimcheon Sangmu FC (Hangul: 김천 상무 프로축구단; Hanja: 金泉 尚武 프로蹴球團) is a South Korean professional association football club based in Gimcheon that competes in the K League 2, the second tier of South Korean football. Sangmu is the sports division of the Republic of Korea Armed Forces.

Sangmu's playing staff is made up of young South Korean professional footballers serving their compulsory two-year military duty. Fifteen players join up at the start of every season and spend two years with the side before returning to their previous professional club. Sangmu are not allowed to sign any foreign players because of their military status.

This article also includes the predecessor military-based teams – Sangmu FC, Gwangju Sangmu FC and Sangju Sangmu FC – which are still separate legal entities.

History

Various military clubs (1950s–1983)
Before the Korea Armed Forces Athletic Corps and its football club Sangmu FC were founded in 1984, the Republic of Korea Armed Forces had three football clubs: ROK Army FC, ROK Marine Corps FC, and ROK Air Force FC. 

The ROK Army originally established football clubs of each corps, including CIC FC (Counter Intelligence Corps; also known as Seoul FC or Seoul Club), HID FC (Headquarters of Intelligence Detachment), Quartermaster Corps FC (consisted of only quartermasters), OPMG FC (Office of the Provost Marshal General; former Military Police Command FC), Engineer Corps FC, and Infantry School FC. Most of them (excluding Quartermaster Corps FC) were merged into the Engineer Corps FC in 1965. Lastly, these two clubs were united, and Army FC was established in 1969.

Afterwards, the Marine Corps FC renamed as ROK Navy FC due to the dissolution of the Headquarters Marine Corps in 1973.

Founding and semi-professional Sangmu FC era (1984–2002)
Sangmu FC was founded on 11 January 1984, as the football side of Korea Armed Forces Athletic Corps.
Although Sangmu squad was composed of professional players from K League clubs, Sangmu FC competed in the semi-professional league (now Korea National League). Sangmu joined the K League for the 1985 season, but spent only one year in the league before dropping out.

The reserve side, Sangmu B, competed in the K2 League from 2003 to 2005 before joining the K League reserve league. Sangmu B was based in Icheon and finished as the runners-up in the 2003 K2 League season.

Gwangju Sangmu era (2002–2010)
After establishing a home base in Gwangju in April 2002, the team participated in the Reserve League. The club has rejoined the K League at the start of the 2003 season as Gwangju Sangmu Bulsajo FC. Between 2004 and 2010, the club has been known as Gwangju Sangmu FC.

Sangju Sangmu era (2011–2020)
Once Gwangju FC was established, Gwangju Sangmu FC was relocated to Sangju, Gyeongsangbuk-do, as Korea Armed Forces Athletic Corps moved to Mungyeong, near Sangju. The club name was officially changed to Sangju Sangmu Phoenix FC in January 2011.

Before the 2013 season, the club officially removed the word "Phoenix" in its name. In the same season, Sangju Sangmu became the first champions of the newly established K League Challenge (second division) and promoted to the K League Classic.

Sangju started the 2020 season already knowing they would be relegated to K League 2. The military club decided to move out of Sangju to a new, as yet undisclosed location. Sangju has decided not to establish a football team which would be citizen-owned outfit and also played in K League 2.

Gimcheon Sangmu (2021–present)
On 30 June 2020, the K League administration announced that the city of Gimcheon had officially submitted an application to host the team for at least the 2021 season, offering their local stadium as the football club's new home. After a preliminary review and several meetings and assemblies involving local governors, the K League eventually approved the proposal and began the process of moving the club to Gimcheon.

Club name history
1996–2002: Sangmu FC
2002–2003: Gwangju Sangmu Bulsajo FC
2004–2010: Gwangju Sangmu FC
2011–2012: Sangju Sangmu Phoenix FC
2013–2020: Sangju Sangmu FC
2021–present: Gimcheon Sangmu FC

Players

Current squad

Coaching staff

Managers

Honours

League 
 K League 2
Winners (3): 2013, 2015, 2021

 National Semi-Professional Football League
Winners (9): 1984, 1991 Fall, 1992 Spring, 1994 Spring, 1996 Fall, 1997 Fall, 1998 Fall, 1999 Fall, 2002 Spring
Runners-up (5): 1987 Fall, 1993 Spring, 1999 Spring, 2000 Spring, 2003

Cups 
 National Semi-Professional Football Championship
Winners (2): 1999, 2001
 National Football Championship
Winners (1): 1996

Notes

Season-by-season records

K League

K League 1 and K League 2

See also
 Korea Armed Forces Athletic Corps
 Boeun Sangmu WFC
 Icheon Sangmu FC

References

External links

Official website 

Gimcheon Sangmu FC
Association football clubs established in 1984
Football clubs in North Gyeongsang Province
Sport in Gimcheon
K League 1 clubs
K League 2 clubs
Football Men
sangmu
1984 establishments in South Korea